Nerozhino is a rural locality (a village) in Bereznikovskoye Rural Settlement, Sobinsky District, Vladimir Oblast, Russia. The population was 5 as of 2010.

Geography 
Nerozhino is located 26 km south of Sobinka (the district's administrative centre) by road. Konnovo is the nearest rural locality.

References 

Rural localities in Sobinsky District